Software was a German electronic duo active from 1984 to 1999, originally composed of  and  The duo formerly used the name Mergener & Weisser.

History
The group released their records under the IC (Innovative Communication) label, which also released a number of other electronic musicians, including Klaus Schulze and the Neue Deutsche Welle group Ideal.

During a brief hiatus from 1990 to 1992, Weisser produced four albums using the Software name with a different group composition: Fragrance with Klaus Schulze and Georg Stettner, and Modesty-Blaze I / II and Cave with Billy Byte (Stephan Töteberg).

After the dissolution of Software in 1999, the two musicians went their separate ways: Peter Mergener continues to compose and play electronic music, while Michael Weisser first founded the group G.E.N.E. (Grooving Electronic Natural Environments), and is currently, among other things, active as a media artist.

The project released one other album in 2007. In September 2017 Weisser without Mergener released six albums under the Software name.

Members
 Michael Weisser – (1984–1999, 2007, 2017)
 Peter Mergener – (1984–1990, 1992–1999)
 Billy Byte – (1990–1993)
 Klaus Schulze – (1990–1992)
 Georg Stettner – (1990–1992)

Discography
Mergener & Weisser
Beam Scape (1984)
Phancyful Fire (1985)
Chip Meditation I (1985)
Chip Meditation II (1985)
Electronic Universe I (1985)
Night-Light (1986)

Software
 Past-Present-Future I (1987)
 Past-Present-Future II (1987) 
 Syn-Code (1987)
 Digital Dance (1988) 
 Electronic Universe II (1988)
 Software Visions (1988)
 Kassettenbuch Dea Alba (1988)
 Visions (1989)
 Live-3rd Dimension (1989)
 Ocean (1990)
 Fragrance (1990)
 Modesty-Blaze I (1991)
 Modesty-Blaze II (1992)
 Software Visions (1992)
 Space Design (1993) 
 Cave (1993)
 Ten Years (1994) 
 Brain Food Music (1994)
 Heaven to Hell (1995)
 Sky-Dive (1997)
 Fire-Works (1998)
 Mystic Millennium I (1999)
 Mystic Millennium II (2000)
 Spring Visions (2007)
 Space World (2017)
 Sacral World (2017)
 Ocean World (2017)
 Erotic World (2017)
 Electronic World (2017)
 Dea Alba (2017)

References

External links
 
 Website of Peter Mergener (German)
 Website of Michael Weisser (German)
 
 Software on Progressive archives

Neue Deutsche Welle groups
Musical groups established in 1984
German new wave musical groups